is a Japanese talk show by NHK. The show began in 2003 and ended in 2009, but is ongoing as a special program. Contrary to the title, Japanese is the main language used in the show, although the Japanese hosts use English when interviewing British, American or Irish celebrities, such as Noel Gallagher, Howard Stringer and Colin Farrell, or when the English language is discussed.

 is a quiz where Patrick Harlan defines a certain word in English, after which contestants must produce the word in question.

NHK recently announced that regular broadcasts of the show would be cancelled, but that "special editions of the program will be aired on an irregular basis".

Cast

Current cast 
  - since April, 2007
 
  - since April, 2007
  - since April, 2007

Past cast 
  - March 31, 2003—March, 2007
  - March 31, 2003—March, 2007

Narrators
  - narrator, March 31, 2003—September, 2006, since April 2008
  - narrator, October, 2006—March 17, 2008, March 16, 2009

Other 
  - guest
  - regular guest

Theme songs 
The opening song from March 31, 2003 until March, 2006: "Help!" performed by the Beatles
The opening song from April, 2006 until March 23, 2007: "Help!" covered by Love Psychedelico
The opening song from April, 2007 until March 2008: "Magical Mystery Tour" covered by Bonnie Pink
The ending song: "A Hard Day's Night" performed by the Beatles.

Broadcasting times 
March 31, 2003—March, 2006: 11:15 p.m.—11:45 p.m. on Mondays
April, 2006—March, 2007: 11:00 p.m.—11:30 p.m. on Fridays
April, 2007—March, 2009: 11:00 p.m.—11:30 p.m. on Mondays
Reruned at 2:10 a.m. on Saturdays

References

External links 
 
 

Japanese variety television shows
NHK original programming
2000s Japanese television series
2003 Japanese television series debuts
2009 Japanese television series endings